Celso Garrido-Lecca (born 9 March 1926) is a Peruvian composer. He was born in Lima and studied composition with Rodolfo Holzmann in Peru's National Conservatory. He concluded his studies in Chile. He was admitted into Universidad de Chile's Theatre Institute as composer and music advisor, and worked there for 10 years. Celso Garrido Lecca entered Universidad de Chile's Composition Department, and was eventually chief of that section. In 1964, he was awarded a scholarship in Tanglewood, and studied there with Aaron Copland. He returned to Perú in 1973, and taught composition at Perú's National Conservatory.

His most important works include "Antaras" for double string quartet and double bass, "Laudes I" and "Laudes II", "Elegía a Macchu Pichu", "Sonata Fantasía" for cello and piano. He is a member of Colegio de Compositores Latinoamericanos de Música de Arte.

References

1926 births
Living people
Peruvian composers
Peruvian male composers
People from Lima
Peruvian people of Spanish descent
Pupils of Aaron Copland
University of Chile alumni
Peruvian expatriates in Chile